The 1946 TCU Horned Frogs football team was an American football team that represented Texas Christian University (TCU) in the Southwest Conference (SWC) during the 1946 college football season. In their 13th year under head coach Dutch Meyer, the Horned Frogs compiled a 2–7–1 record (2–4 against SWC opponents) and were outscored by a total of 148 to 90.

Tackle Weldon Edwards was selected by both the Associated Press and United Press as a first-team player on the 1946 All-Southwest Conference football team.

The Frogs played their home games in Amon G. Carter Stadium, which is located on campus in Fort Worth, Texas.

Schedule

After the season

The 1947 NFL Draft was held on December 16, 1946. The following Horned Frogs were selected.

References

TCU
TCU Horned Frogs football seasons
TCU Horned Frogs football